George Brevard Sinner is an American politician and member of the North Dakota Democratic-Nonpartisan League Party who served as a member of the North Dakota Senate, representing the 46th district from 2013 to 2017. Sinner is the son of former Governor George A. Sinner and was the D-NPL nominee for North Dakota's at-large congressional district in the 2014 election.

References

External links
 
George Sinner for District 46 Senate, campaign website
Senator George Sinner in the North Dakota Legislative Branch

Living people
Democratic Party North Dakota state senators
Politicians from Fargo, North Dakota
University of North Dakota alumni
21st-century American politicians
Year of birth missing (living people)